André Budzien (born 28 August 1962) is a German sailor who has won multiple world championships with victories at the Master World Championship for the Finn class and the two time OK Dinghy open World Champion.

References

External links
 

1962 births
Living people
German male sailors (sport)
OK class world champions
Finn class world champions
World champions in sailing for Germany